Filopaludina javanica or Idiopoma javanica is a species of large freshwater snail with a gill and an operculum, an aquatic gastropod mollusk in the family Viviparidae.

Subspecies
There are recognized two subspecies:
 Filopaludina javanica javanica (von dem Busch, 1844)
 Filopaludina javanica continentalis or Idiopoma javanica continentalis Brandt, 1974

Distribution 
This species is found in Thailand, Cambodia, Vietnam, Laos, Peninsular Malaysia and Indonesia (Sumatra and Java).

Description
The height of the shell is 30–35 mm.

Ecology
This species inhabits ponds, rice fields and irrigation channels.

Parasites of Filopaludina javanica include Echinostoma echinatum (see also Beaver et al. 1984).

Human use

Filopaludina javanica is prepared by boiling and it used often as part of the cuisine of Java.

References

External links

 van Benthem Jutting W. S. S. (1956). "Systematic Studies On The Non-Marine Mollusca Of The Indo-Australian Archipelago. Critical Revision of The Javanese Freshwater Gastropods". Treubia 23(2): 259-477.
  Küster H. C. (1852). "Die Gattungen Paludina, Hydrocaena und Valvata in Abbildungen nach dem Natur". ''Systematisches Conchylien-cabinet von Martini und Chemnitz fortgesetzt von Hofrath Dr. G. H. v. Schubert und Professor J. A. Wagner. Verlag von Bauer und Raspe, Nürnberk. 96 pp. 24-25, tab. 5, fig. 7-10.

Viviparidae